Jeannie Hovland is a Santee Dakota Sioux tribal member and an American government official. Hovland serves as the vice chair of the National Indian Gaming Commission and is the director of the Office of Self-Regulation. She was previously the commissioner for the Administration for Native Americans and deputy assistant secretary for Native American affairs.

Early life and education 
Hovland is an enrolled member of the Flandreau Santee Sioux Tribe of South Dakota. She attended Associate Schools Inc. Travel Agent School in North Miami Beach, Florida.

Career 
Hovland is a Republican, and began her career as the CEO of Wanji Native Nations Consultants. She later worked in the office of U.S. Senator John Thune as a Tribal Affairs Advisor. Hovland went on to serve as senior advisor to the Assistant Secretary for Indian Affairs at the Department of the Interior.

Since August 2021, Hovland has served as vice chair of the National Indian Gaming Commission (NIGC). She is one of three commissioners responsible for regulating and ensuring the integrity of the more
than 527 Indian gaming facilities, associated with over 250 tribes across 29 states.  

Before joining NIGC, Hovland served as Commissioner of the Administration for
Native Americans providing oversight of a $57 million annual operating budget
to promote self-sufficiency for American Indians, Alaska Natives, Native
Hawaiians, and Pacific Islanders. Hovland oversaw discretionary grants that
support social and economic development, Native language restoration and
revitalization, and environmental regulatory enhancement. Hovland created the
Social and Economic Development Strategies for Growing Organizations
program, which provides funding to strengthen internal governance structures and
build capacity for tribes and tribal organizations. She also served as Deputy
Assistant Secretary for Native American Affairs at the Administration for
Children and Families (ACF), a $58 billion operating division under the Department of Health and Human Services
(HHS). Hovland provided expert and culturally appropriate advice to the Assistant Secretary in the formulation of policy,
positions, and strategies affecting Native Americans. 

Hovland chaired the HHS Secretary’s Intradepartmental Council on Native American Affairs (ICNAA), serving as an
advisor to the Secretary, addressing issues of importance to tribal communities through partnerships with all of HHS
departments. Hovland helped bring national awareness to the crisis of Missing and Murdered Native American’s
through her role on the ICNAA as well as through her participation on the Presidential Taskforce, Operation Lady
Justice. Under Hovland’s leadership, as chair of the ACF Native American Affairs Advisory Committee, composed of
ACF leadership and in partnership with the ACF Tribal Advisory Committee, the ACF Missing and Murdered Native
Americans - A Public Health Framework for Action was published in October 2020. 

In her previous role as Senior Advisor to the Assistant Secretary for Indian Affairs at the Department of the Interior,
Hovland provided strategic recommendations to the Assistant Secretary on issues related to land leases, access to
quality water, land into trust status, and energy and economic development issues. 

Hovland’s extensive knowledge and experience in Indian Affairs include her many years serving Native American
communities in South Dakota where she worked for Senator John Thune for nearly 13 years. As Tribal Affairs Advisor,
Hovland dedicated most of her time in the communities as she believes in community driven solutions. During that
time, Hovland was able to provide input on important legislation such as the Tribal Law and Order Act and the Code
Talkers Recognition Act of 2008.

References 

Living people
Trump administration personnel
Native American women in politics
Native Americans in Washington, D.C.
South Dakota Republicans
Flandreau Santee Sioux people
Year of birth missing (living people)
21st-century Native American women
21st-century Native Americans